Hungarian dance refers to the folk dances practised and performed by the Hungarians, both amongst the populations native to Hungary and its neighbours, and also amongst the Hungarian diaspora.

According to György Martin, a prominent folklore expert, Hungarian dances can be divided into two categories. The first refers to dances performed in the middle ages while the second relates to the 18th and 19th century. Hungarians have been noted for their "exceptionally well developed sense of rhythm". In the mid-19th century, Musicologist Theodor Billroth performed tests with troops of various nationalities stationed in Vienna and found that the Hungarian troops outperformed others in keeping time with music.

Improvisation and energetic movements are often mentioned as being characteristic of Hungarian dance. Daniel Berzsenyi wrote, "Its secret laws are not ordered by craft. The laws are its own and enthusiasm sets the limit." Elizabeth Charlotte Rearick wrote, "The peasant dance is not one which is set absolutely according to rule; the dancer constructs his steps according to his mood and ingenuity." Collections of the Folk Music Research Group of the Hungarian Academy of Sciences, and the national Ethnographic Museum of the State Folk Ensemble cover almost 10,000 dance variations from 700 Hungarian villages. 

The Reformed Church in Hungary was opposed to dancing, but the Catholic Church was less restrictive. Some Catholic authors wrote of their approval of dancing, particularly in heaven. One early 16th-century nun who described that "dancing will be essential there for the strong, well-built bodies of the saints," while in the 18th century, Catholic priest Zsigmond Csuzy wrote "There would have to be dancing (in heaven) for the itching soles of the Hungarian whose whole life on earth is a dancing school."

Csárdás 

The Csárdás is regarded as the most important Hungarian folk dance. It is a newer style of dance developed in the 18th and 19th centuries, and features Hungarian embroidered costumes and energetic music. From the men's intricate bootslapping dances to the ancient women's circle dances, Csárdás demonstrates the infectious exuberance of the Hungarian folk dancing still celebrated in the villages.

In the 1869 book The Magyars: Their Country and Institutions, Arthur Patterson described the dance: "they whirl swiftly round, two or three times, and then, breaking away, recommence the pantomime as before... One seldom sees two couples performing exactly the same figure at the same time. While two separated partners are doing their step with their backs turned on one another, another couple between them are spinning round in the ecstasies of reunion." 

Martin describes a number of variations of the Csárdás in his 1974 book Hungarian Folk Dances. Figures danced during the Swift Csárdás include the lippentos-martogatos (crouching-dunking), turning in pairs, and playful alluring and releasing of the partner. The Csárdás as danced by older people in the 1970s included half crouching, half turning figures. In the village of Jaszszentandras, Martin recorded a rare form of the Broom Dance in which "the broom is put through a crouching, tripping movement."

Other notable folk dances
Ugrós (Jumping dances): Old style dances dating back to the Middle Ages. Solo or couple dances accompanied by old style music, shepherd and other solo man's dances from Transylvania, and marching dances along with remnants of medieval weapon dances belong in this group.

Karikázó: a circle dance performed by women only accompanied by singing of folksongs.
Verbunkos: a solo man's dance evolved from the recruiting performances of the Austro-Hungarian army.
The Legényes: is a men's solo dance done by the ethnic Hungarian people living in the Kalotaszeg region of Transylvania. Although usually danced by young men, it can be also danced by older men. The dance is performed freestyle usually by one dancer at a time in front of the band. Women participate in the dance by standing in lines to the side and sing/shout verses while the men dance. Each lad does a number of points (dance phrases) typically 4 to 8 without repetition. Each point consists of 4 parts, each lasting 4 counts. The first part is usually the same for everyone (there are only a few variations).

References and notes